Petra Lux (born 1956 in Hermsdorf, Thuringia) is a German civil rights activist, journalist, novelist, Taichi and Qigong teacher.

Biography 

Petra Lux grew up in a Catholic family and studied 1976–1980 Journalism at the Karl-Marx-Universität Leipzig. As a journalist she saw in the GDR no opportunity to realize their ideals, so they became involved as a youth clubhouse director of "Jörgen Schmidtchen" in Leipzig-Schönefeld for difficult youngsters, events organized literary evenings with non-conformist artists like Franz Fühmann and Wolfgang Hilbig and songwriters with critical texts. She founded the first women's center in a state House of Culture of the GDR, and organized, as well as the first cultural institution in the country, dance evenings for same-sex couples. She was then summarily dismissed in 1983.

In their living rooms and of her husband's workshop then were held discussion groups and illegal concerts with artists who critically with the SED dictatorship grappled with, among others, Peter Gläser, Radjo Monk, Jürgen B. Wolff, Joachim Schäfer and Dieter Kalka. Her private photo lab she set for the production of critical materials.

On October 3, 1989 Petra Lux joined the Neues Forum (New Forum) and was among others at its spokeswoman. [5] She was a co-signatory of the call of the New Forum of October 12, 1989: "We demand immediate, here and now, public, equal dialogue ...".

1990–91 she worked as a journalist for women's issues at the DAZ (Die Andere Zeitung/The Other Newspaper) and then again as a freelance author for print and broadcast media as well as the Leipziger Dokumentar- und Kurzfilmfestival (Leipzig Documentary and Short Film Festival).

Shortly before the turn she had come with Asian movement and therapy types in contact, among others, met Bert Hellinger Family Constellations and trained as a Taichi teacher. From 1995, they had their own courses in Taichi, Qigong, Reiki, Family Constellations and lectures about Runes in their YINYANG center in Leipzig, whose 20th anniversary was celebrated on September 6, 2015th.

Books 
 Die Zeit der Schmetterlinge. Eine unendliche Biografie. Roman. Vega Verlag, 2005, .
 as a publisher together with Erica Fischer: Ohne uns ist kein Staat zu machen. DDR-Frauen nach der Wende. Kiepenheuer & Witsch, 1995, .

References

External links 
 Website of the yinyangzentrums Leipzig
 Heroes of the peaceful revolution
 Short profile of Petra Lux

German women writers
Feminist writers
Living people
1956 births
Writers from Thuringia
Leipzig University alumni
East German dissidents
People from Saale-Holzland-Kreis
20th-century German women